Richard of Pudlicott (died 1305), also known as Richard de Podelicote (or Pudlicote, or Dick Puddlecote), was an English wool merchant who, down on his luck, became an infamous burglar of King Edward I's Wardrobe treasury at Westminster Abbey in 1303. Richard, along with high-ranked accomplices, stole a large portion of the king's treasury of gems, antique gold and coins, estimated at over 100,000 pounds, or about equal to a year's tax revenue for the Kingdom of England. When priceless objects began flooding pawn shops, houses of prostitution and even fishing nets in the River Thames, the king and his ministers, away at war in Scotland, were alerted. Many dozens of people were rounded up and jailed in a wide and indiscriminate net and eventually brought to one of the biggest trials of the High Middle Ages in England. Ultimately most of the loot was recovered and a dozen or so were hanged, including Richard, but most escaped the executioner. Richard gave a false confession that he was the only one involved, saving the clergy—his inside accomplices—from being condemned. After his hanging, his body was flayed, and legend said his skin was nailed to the door of Westminster Abbey as a warning to other would-be criminals.  A 2005 study of the door, dating back to the reign of King Edward I (making it the oldest door in England) revealed the legend to be false.  The fragments of hide found under the door's lone surviving iron strap turned out to be from an animal hide which once covered the door.

Legacy
Pudlicott is featured in a BBC TV movie titled Heist (2008) made about the events of 1303. His character was played by Kris Marshall.

Further reading
Luke Owen Pike (1873). A History of Crime in England, Vol.1, pp. 199–203 and 466–7. From Google Books
Hubert Hall (1891). The Antiquities and Curiosities of the Exchequer, pp. 18–33. From Google Books
Paul Doherty (2005). The Great Crown Jewels Robbery of 1303: The Extraordinary Story of the First Big Bank Raid in History.

References

External links
Thomas Frederick Tout (1916). A Mediaeval Burglary. From Internet Archive

Burglars
Medieval English criminals
People executed under the Plantagenets
1306 deaths
Year of birth unknown
Executed English people
People executed by the Kingdom of England by hanging
14th-century English people
Medieval thieves
14th-century criminals
14th-century executions by England